Waimaha may be:
Waimoa language in East Timor
Waimajã language in Colombia